Khanlu may refer to:
 Khanlu, East Azerbaijan
 Khanlu, Zanjan